Local elections were held in South Korea on 25 April 1952 for city, town and township councils and on 10 May 1952 for provincial councils. 306 provincial councilors, 378 city councilors, 1,115 town councilors and 16,051 township councilors were elected.

City, town and township council elections 
Elections for city, town and township councils were held on 25 April 1952.

Provincial council elections 
Elections for provincial councils were held on 10 May 1952.

Results per province

References 

1952 elections in South Korea
1952